Like Cats and Dogs is a compilation album by English alternative rock band Catherine Wheel, released 9 September 1996 by Fontana Records in the UK and Mercury Records in the US. The album includes an alternate version of "Heal" from Happy Days (retitled "Heal 2"), several outtakes and B-sides spanning the band's career, and cover versions of songs originally by Pink Floyd and Rush. The Rush song "Spirit of Radio" had been recorded earlier in the year for a CD entitled "Spirit of the edge Vol. 2" (copyright 1996 Mercury/Polydor Records) which was put out by Toronto radio station CFNY for which the song had originally been written.

Bassist Dave Hawes said of the album:

Track listing
"Heal 2" – 5:09
"Wish You Were Here" (Pink Floyd) – 3:28
"Mouthful of Air" – 2:42
"Car" – 6:42
"Girl Stand Still" – 8:08
"Saccharine" – 6:04
"Backwards Guitar" – 5:10
"Tongue Twisted" – 5:41
"These Four Walls" – 5:21
"High Heels" – 3:35
"Harder Than I Am" – 4:15
"La La Lala La" – 10:44
"Something Strange / Angelo Nero / Spirit of Radio" (Rush) – 10:55

Personnel
Musicians
Rob Dickinson – guitar, vocals
Brian Futter – guitar
Dave Hawes – bass guitar
Neil Sims – drums, percussion

Production
Tim Friese-Greene – producer
Rob Dickinson – producer
Gil Norton – producer
John Lee – producer, engineer
Paul Corkett – engineer
Clif Norrell – mixing
Bob Ludwig – mastering
Storm Thorgerson – design
Finlay Cowan – design
Peter Curzon – design
Tim Hale – photography
Tony May – photography
Rupert Truman – photography
Richard Manning – illustrations
Julien Mills – illustrations

References

Catherine Wheel albums
Albums with cover art by Storm Thorgerson
Albums produced by Gil Norton
B-side compilation albums
1996 compilation albums
Fontana Records compilation albums
Albums recorded at Rockfield Studios